Cromos is a Colombian varieties and photojournalism magazine, known for widely covering the Miss Colombia pageant on editions called Mini Cromos. The magazine was founded in 1916 by Miguel Santiago Valencia and Abelardo Arboleda, both from the Colombian city of Popayán. It is published on a weekly basis and has its headquarters in Bogotá, D.C.

Cromos is part of the Library of Congress September 11 Web Archive and preserves the web expressions of individuals, groups, the press, and institutions in the United States and from around the world in the aftermath of the attacks in the US on September 11, 2001.

See also
 El Espectador

References

Further reading
 Cruz Ramírez, Marisol. "La Americanización de la Revista Cromos 1944-1950", Trabajo de grado, Universidad Nacional de Colombia, Sede Bogotá, 2010.

External links

Magazines published in Colombia
Magazines established in 1916
Mass media in Bogotá
Photography magazines
Photojournalistic magazines
Spanish-language magazines
Weekly magazines